The 1985–86 DFB-Pokal was the 43rd season of the annual German football cup competition. It began on 24 August 1985 and ended on 3 May 1986. 64 teams competed in the tournament of six rounds. In their third consecutive final Bayern Munich defeated VfB Stuttgart 5–2.

Matches

First round

Replay

Second round

Replays

Round of 16

Replay

Quarter-finals

Semi-finals

Final

References

External links
 Official site of the DFB 
 Kicker.de 

1985-86
1985–86 in German football cups